Bebe Patten (September 13, 1913 – January 25, 2004) was the founder of Patten University (formerly Oakland Bible Institute), Patten Academy, Christian Cathedral and the Christian Evangelical Churches of America, Inc. denomination.

Born Willa "Willie" Bebe Harrison on September 13, 1913 to Newton and Matricia Priscilla Harrison, she began attending L.I.F.E. Bible College at seventeen, and upon graduation from L.I.F.E., became the Tennessee State Evangelist of the International Church of the Foursquare Gospel. In the summer of 1932 Bebe married Alton Bowman but the couple was divorced at the end of 1933. Bebe conducted revival campaigns as a "girl evangelist" first with Lettie Harper and later with Mabel Lawson. Both of these co-workers were also graduates of L.I.F.E. Bible College. In 1935, Bebe Harrison married C. Thomas Patten, who worked with her during her evangelistic crusades and her Oakland revival services. Bebe and Carl were ordained by the Fundamental Ministerial and Layman Association (FMLA - current name: Association of Fundamental Ministers and Churches) on July 6, 1937. The Temple Lighthouse Church in Cleveland, Ohio, the church of which Bebe and Carl were pastors, was also a FMLA-member church. Bebe and Carl left the FMLA in 1943 and were ordained by the International Ministerial Foundation, Inc. of Fresno, California.

Patten became a national evangelist, arrived in Oakland, California, in 1944 and began an evangelistic crusade there. The meetings continued nightly for nineteen weeks, in which as many as 5,000 people a night attended in the Oakland Auditorium Arena. This crusade led in 1944 to the founding of the Oakland Bible Institute (now Patten University) and the Academy of Christian Education high school (now Patten Academy of Christian Education: K-12), Christian Temple (now Christian Cathedral), and the Oakland Bible Church (now Christian Evangelical Churches of America, Inc.) C. Thomas Patten would spend 3 year in San Quentin for stealing money from his congregation.  He later died in a rehabilitation hospital from his addiction to morphine.

Bebe Patten had three children: identical twins Rebecca and Priscilla in 1950 and Thomas Patten Jr. in 1954.

For her achievements in education and religion, Patten received resolutions from the California State Senate (1978, 1994, and 2003) and Elihu Harris (1994).

Media appearances 
The Shepherd Hour, a daily 30-minute radio program was broadcast from 1951 to 1987. Her telecast, The Bebe Patten Hour, aired from 1976 to the 2004, and her periodical The Trumpet Call was published from 1952 to 2004.

Jewish community work 

Patten was an outspoken supporter of Israel. Beginning in 1962 she took her church congregation and students of Patten University on more than 25 trips to Israel. In 1975, she was named Christian Honoree of the Year by the San Francisco chapter of the Jewish National Fund, and she received several honors and awards from Israel, including the State of Israel Medallion in 1969.

She interviewed Prime Minister David Ben-Gurion in 1972 and later Prime Minister Menachem Begin. She also had audiences with Yitzhak Shamir, Yitzhak Rabin, and Ariel Sharon.

In 1975 and 1977, Patten University planted two forests of 10,000 trees in the Negev region of Israel. In 1981, Bar-Ilan University honored her with the Bebe Patten Chair of Social Action and appointed her a member of the university’s international board in 1991.

Racial and social issues 

Patten was also known for promoting racial equality in all the institutions she founded. Patten University was recognized as a “model of diversity,” but her influence began much earlier.

During the mid-1930s and 1940s two of her revivals burned her revivalist tent to the ground after she preached against racism, segregation and social injustices that took place in the South.

She attended the funeral of the Rev. Martin Luther King Jr. and personally offered her condolences to Coretta Scott King, his widow.

Death and legacy 

Patten died at 90 years of age on January 25, 2004, after a long illness.

Patten’s second husband, C. Thomas Patten, died in 1958, and two of her children predeceased her, Thomas Patten Jr. in 1989 and Priscilla Benham in 2000. She was survived by her daughter Rebecca Skaggs and one grandchild, Charmaine Benham.

Her biography, Winning the Race: Dr. Bebe Patten, Her Life and Ministry, written by Glenn Kunkel, was released in 2000.

A second biography, No Room For Doubt: The Life and Ministry of Bebe Patten, written by Dr. Abraham Ruelas, was published by Seymour Press in 2012.

References

External links
 Patten University

1913 births
2004 deaths
Patten University